Federal Highway 193 (Carretera Federal 193) is a Federal Highway of Mexico. The highway travels from Las Cruces, Chiapas in the north to Arriaga, Chiapas in the south. Federal Highway 193 serves as a connector between Mexican Federal Highway 190 and Mexican Federal Highway 200 in southwest Chiapas.

The designation has since been subsumed by Highway 190. ako ay isang pilipino

References

193